Acantopsis dialuzona is a loach native to the swift, clear streams and rivers of mainland and archipelagic Southeast Asia, from India to Indonesia through the Chao Phraya and Mekong river basins. It can also be found in flooded fields.

The horseface loach or horsehead loach, formerly known as Acantopsis choirorhynchos, is now recognized as belonging to this species.

Taxonomy 
Under Maurice Kottelat's review and revision of the loaches in 2012, this species name is considered to be a junior synonym of A. dialuzona.

Aquarium Keeping 
A very similar species is the unofficially named longnose loach, Acantopsis octoactinotos, from which the horseface can be distinguished by the latter's down-turned (horse-like) nose. Additionally, the horseface loach buries itself in the bottom substratum (if silt or fine sand); the longnose loach does not. The horseface loach is fast moving; the longnose is rather slow. However, the longnose is more aggressive, regularly feeding on juvenile fishes.

The horseface loach's native substrate is one of sand or gravel, wherein it will characteristically burrow itself. These loaches spend much of their time buried in the substrate, leaving only their eyes uncovered. Due to this incessant burrowing, any live plants should be potted to avoid uprooting. The use of floating plants is recommended, as these loaches prefer subdued lighting. Horseface loaches are not picky eaters, but live food (such as tubifex) is relished.

The horseface loach is most active at night and mostly keeps to itself. , it had not been bred in captivity. It was first imported into Europe in 1929 by Edmund Riechers of Hamburg, Germany.

Local names
 Laotian: ອິດ 
  .

See also

 List of freshwater aquarium fish species

References

Bibliography
 Baensch, Hans A., and Riehl, Rudiger. (1997). Baensch Aquarium Atlas, Vol. 1. (6th ed.), p. 366. Microcosm Ltd.; Shelburne, Vermont.

External links
  Oijen, M.J.P. van & G.M.P. Loots, An illustrated translation of Bleeker’s Fishes of the Indian Archipelago Part II Cyprini; Zoologische Mededelingen, 86 (May 2012)

Cobitidae
Fish of the Mekong Basin
Fish of Myanmar
Fish of Cambodia
Freshwater fish of India
Freshwater fish of Indonesia
Fish of Laos
Freshwater fish of Malaysia
Fish of Thailand
Fish of Vietnam
Freshwater fish of Asia
Fish of Southeast Asia
Fish described in 1823
Brackish water organisms
Taxa named by Johan Conrad van Hasselt